Sorhagenia reconditella is a moth in the family Cosmopterigidae. It is found in Greece and on Cyprus.

The wingspan is about 8 mm. Adults have been recorded from mid-May to the beginning of June.

References

External links
lepiforum.de

Moths described in 1983
Chrysopeleiinae
Moths of Europe